Horam is a village, electoral ward and civil parish in the Wealden District of East Sussex, situated  south of Heathfield.  Included in the parish are the settlements of Vines Cross and Burlow.

History
The village of Horam grew up around the railway station and was formerly known as 'Horeham' or 'Horeham Road'. The railway station (closed in 1965 under the Beeching Axe) was originally named ‘Horeham Road for Waldron’. In 1891 it became ‘Horeham Road and Waldron’. In 1925 the village changed its name to Horam, although the station persevered with ‘Waldron and Horeham Road’ until 1935. The dialling code for Horam is still listed as 'Horam Road'.

Vines Cross is named after John Vyne, who was a local vintner in 1595. Like many other settlements on the Weald, Horam was involved in the Wealden iron industry.

Governance
Horam Parish Council consists of twelve members.

Geography
Horam village lies on the A267 Tunbridge Wells–Eastbourne road south of Heathfield. The area is on the slopes of the Weald: there are many headwater streams of the River Cuckmere, carving out valleys, the main one being the Waldron Ghyll (or Gill).

Transport
Horam is served by various routes of the Eastbourne Bus Company.
The former railway line is now the Cuckoo Trail footpath through the village.

Religion

The village is served by Christ Church (the local Church of England church) which is found in Horebeech Lane. The present vicar is Peter-John Guy. The small church in Vines Cross was dedicated to St James but is no longer in existence.

Education
Primary education is provided at Maynards Green Primary School.
St Mary's School, Horam is a secondary day and residential special school, located at Maynards Green.

Notable locals
The author and naturalist Walter J.C. Murray lived in Horam and his book A Sanctuary Planted describes the cultivation of his garden on Little London Road in Horam as a private nature sanctuary. His book Copsford describes a year spent in a derelict cottage on land between Furnace Lane and Dern Lane.

Horam on film
Jack Brookman, a local amateur film maker who lived on Vines Cross Road and then Tollwood Road in Horam made a number of short films documenting Horam which are available free to view on YouTube.

References

External links

Villages in East Sussex
Civil parishes in East Sussex
Wealden District